Olovyannaya is an urban locality (an urban-type settlement) and the administrative center of Olovyanninsky District in Zabaykalsky Krai, Russia. As of the 2010 census, the population was 8,406, down from 11,859 in 1989.

The town is located 249 km by rail from Chita. There is a museum of local history and a hospital.

History
Olovyannaya was founded in 1895 with the construction of a railroad station. After the station was constructed, lime kilns, a sawmill, and a jetty for receiving barges were also constructed. A bridge over the Onon River was exploded during the Russian Civil War. The town became the administrative center of the district in 1926, and in 1929 the town was given the status of an urban settlement.

Notable people
Aleksandr Yakovlevich Mikhailov (born 1944), actor

References

Urban-type settlements in Zabaykalsky Krai
1898 establishments in the Russian Empire